Saint-Martin-de-Ribérac (literally Saint-Martin of Ribérac; Limousin: Sent Martin de Rabairac) is a commune in the Dordogne department in Nouvelle-Aquitaine in southwestern France.

Population

History
The commune of Saint-Martin-de-Ribérac was created in 1851, when it was separated from the commune of Ribérac.

See also
Communes of the Dordogne department

References

External links

 Location on the map of France

Communes of Dordogne